Tomoplagia pura is a species of tephritid or fruit flies in the genus Tomoplagia of the family Tephritidae.

Distribution
Cuba, Puerto Rico.

References

Tephritinae
Insects described in 1931
Diptera of South America